The 1890 Franklin & Marshall football team was an American football team that represented Franklin & Marshall College during the 1890 college football season. The team compiled an 8–2 record. Its eight victories included games against Penn State (10–0) and Lafayette (18–10). Its two losses were against Princeton (33–16) and Penn (28–0). The team played its home games at McGrann's Park in Lancaster, Pennsylvania. William Mann Irvine was the team captain and also played at the fullback position.

Schedule

Roster

 William Mann Irvine, Sem., fullback and captain, age 25, 176 pounds, 5'11"
 E. O. Nothstein, Class of 1891, halfback, age 22, 165 pounds, 5'11"
 Calvin N. Gabriel, Class of 1891, halfback, age 24, 164 pounds, 5'10-1/2"
 J. A. Apple, Class of 1892, quarterback, age 17, 145 pounds, 5'10-1/2"
 E. W. Stonebreaker, Sem., right end, age 29, 155 pounds, 5'10-1/2"
 T. H. Krick, Class of 1892, right tackle, age 22, 170 pounds, 6'
 D. J. Wolfe, Class of 1893, right guard, age 23, 178 pounds, 5'8"
 F. M. Line, Class of 1888, center, age 23, 172 pounds, 6', 1-1/2"
 A. H. Smith, Sem., left guard, age 25, 182 pounds, 5'4-1/2"
 Simon U. Waugaman, Class of 1889, left guard (sub.), age 29, 167 pounds, 5'11-1/2"
 A. F. Harrold, Class of 1891, left tackle, age 22, 180 pounds, 6'
 Bruce Griffith, Class of 1890, left end, age 23, 147 pounds, 5'7"

References

Franklin and Marshall
Franklin & Marshall Diplomats football seasons
Franklin and Marshall football